Hamburg Airlines was a small German regional airline carrier that formed in 1988 and was owned by Eugene Block. The company later dissolved after it went bankrupt in 1997.

History
Hamburg Airlines was founded in April 1988 and commenced operations with a Dornier 228 with services between its home base of Hamburg and Rotterdam and Westerland.  A couple of months later a second Dornier 228 was added and services expanded to Antwerp and Gothenburg.  By the end of 1988 a de Havilland Canada Dash 8 was added and the airline expanded operations.

With the reunification of Germany, flights to the east were added. The airline leased a Fokker 100 and the routes of Berlin based Tempelhof Airways were taken over, thus Berlin becoming a second hub for Hamburg Airlines.  As destinations expanded, London Gatwick Airport, Kaliningrad and Riga were served.  Unfortunately, Hamburg Airlines was losing money so in 1993 it was sold to Saarland Airlines (a charter company), but Hamburg Airlines continued to operate independently of the parent company. Block retained 20% shareholding and was given a seat on the Saarland board.  

In 1993 Saarland Airlines went bankrupt and Hamburg Airlines ceased operations for a short period until revived in December 1993.  The aircraft of choice for the resurrected Hamburg Airlines was the BAe 146.  Things did not go well for Hamburg Airlines and by 1997 it was in dire financial problems. When no buyer or merger partner could be found, Hamburg Airlines was liquidated on 21 December 1997.

Fleet

Hamburg Airlines operated the following types of aircraft during its existence:

Dornier 228
de Havilland DHC-8
Fokker 100
BAe 146-100
BAe 146-200
BAe 146-300

References
Citations

Bibliography
 

Defunct airlines of Germany
Airlines established in 1988
Airlines disestablished in 1997
1988 establishments in West Germany
Companies based in Hamburg
German companies established in 1988
German companies disestablished in 1997